James Albert Kemp (April 9, 1919 – October 21, 1993), nicknamed "Gabby", was an American Negro league second baseman and manager between 1937 and 1941.

A native of Winder, Georgia, Kemp made his Negro leagues debut in 1937 with the Atlanta Black Crackers. He served as player-manager of the club in 1938, and again in 1939 when the club moved to Indianapolis. Kemp finished his career with a short stint with the Jacksonville Red Caps in 1941. He died in Atlanta, Georgia in 1993 at age 74.

References

External links
 and Baseball-Reference Black Baseball stats and Seamheads

1919 births
1993 deaths
Atlanta Black Crackers players
Jacksonville Red Caps players
Negro league baseball managers
Baseball second basemen
Baseball players from Georgia (U.S. state)
People from Winder, Georgia
20th-century African-American sportspeople